Isle of Raasay distillery is a Scotch whisky distillery on the Inner Hebridean Isle of Raasay in Northwest Scotland. The distillery is owned by R&B Distillers and was the first legal distillery on the Isle of Raasay when it opened in 2017.

Production
R&B Distillers was founded in 2014 by Alasdair Day and Bill Dobbie. The company started its operations at the Isle of Raasay in September 2017 after receiving its distiller's license. The water used during the distilling process in the production of whisky comes from a Celtic Iron Age well. The water has a high mineral content derived from the island's volcanic and sandstone rock.

The whisky is distilled in copper pot stills and is matured at the distillery on Raasay in a variety of oak casks. The distillery will produce approximately 200,000 litres of pure alcohol per year. The distillery's flagship brand is Isle of Raasay Single Malt Scotch Whisky released since 2020. Since then, the distillery has also released a number of limited special and single cask whiskeys.

Location and visitor centre
The distillery is based on the site of a former disused hotel called Borodale House on the southwest of the island. The Isle of Raasay Distillery also has a visitors’ centre that opened in January 2018. It was awarded 5 stars by VisitScotland as a tourist attraction in June 2018. The distillery also features a six–bedroom hotel with views over the Isle of Skye.

Awards
IWSC 2016 Silver, ISC 2016 Bronze, HKIWSC 2016 Bronze
 ISC 2017 Bronze
 IWSC Silver 2018
 IWSC Silver 2016 for Raasay While We Wait Second Release
 World Whiskies Awards 2018 Best Scotch Grain

See also
 List of distilleries in Scotland

References

Distilleries in Scotland
Scottish malt whisky
2014 establishments in Scotland
Raasay